Jamestown High School is the name of several high schools in the United States.

Jamestown High School (New York) of Jamestown, New York
Jamestown High School (North Dakota) of Jamestown, North Dakota
Jamestown High School (Virginia) of Williamsburg, Virginia